George Wallace Campbell (born 29 January 1920) was a Scottish footballer who played for Dumbarton and Stirling Albion.

References

1920 births
Scottish footballers
Dumbarton F.C. players
Stirling Albion F.C. players
Scottish Football League players
Possibly living people
Association football wing halves
Vale of Leven F.C. players